Roc Books is a fantasy imprint of Penguin Group, as part of its New American Library. It was launched in April 1990 after Penguin Chairman Peter Mayer asked John Silbersack, the editor in chief of New American Library's science fiction (SF) program, to launch a new imprint that would draw more attention to Penguin's SF presence. The name Roc Books was chosen as a homage to Penguin's many famous bird-named publishing imprints. Roc was named after the enormous predatory bird of the Arabian Nights. After Penguin's merger with G.P. Putnam's Sons the imprint was aligned with Ace books and the current editorial team at Roc is the same team that edits the Ace imprint, although the two imprints maintain a separate identity.

Inaugural list

The first monthly list at Roc was:

 Robot Visions: Isaac Asimov
 The Warrior Lives: Joel Rosenberg
 Project Solar Sail: Arthur C. Clarke
 Among Madmen: Jim Starlin & Daina Grazuinas
 Barrow: John Deakins

List of authors

 Taylor Anderson
 Isaac Asimov
 John Steakley
 Stephen Baxter
 Peter S. Beagle
 Jim Murdoch
 Steve Bein
 Carol Berg
 Anne Bishop
 M. L. Brennan
 Jim Butcher
 Rachel Caine
 Jacqueline Carey
 J. Kathleen Cheney
 Karen Chance
 Nancy A. Collins
 Arthur C. Clarke
 Glen Cook
 James K. Decker
 Mary Gentle
 Charles L. Grant
 Simon R. Green
 Chris Marie Green
 Laurell K. Hamilton
 Barb Hendee
 J. C. Hendee
 Douglas Hulick
 Faith Hunter
 Guy Gavriel Kay
 Caitlin R. Kiernan
 Patricia Kennealy-Morrison
 E. E. Knight
 Ursula K. Le Guin
 Dan McGirt
 Dennis L. McKiernan
 Devon Monk
 Grant Naylor
 Chloe Neill
 Andre Norton
 Terry Pratchett
 Judith and Garfield Reeves-Stevens
 Kat Richardson
 Joel Rosenberg
 Jamie Schultz
 M. J. Scott
 Luke Scull
 Thomas E. Sniegoski
 Jim Starlin
 S. M. Stirling
 Harry Turtledove
 Anne Bishop
 Kathleen Tierney
 Rob Thurman
 Boris Vallejo
 Django Wexler

Roc was publisher of FASA's game-related Battletech and Shadowrun novels beginning with Shadowrun: The Secrets of Power #2: Choose Your Enemies Carefully by Robert N. Charette in February 1991.

See also

References

 
1990 establishments in New York City
American speculative fiction publishers
Book publishing companies based in New York (state)
Fantasy book publishers
Publishing companies established in 1990
Science fiction publishers
Roc (mythology)